Tom Hackett (born 10 May 1992) is an Australian former professional American football punter. He was signed as an undrafted free agent by the New York Jets in 2016. He played college football for the Utah Utes. Hackett won the Ray Guy Award in 2014 and 2015.

Professional career
Hackett signed as an undrafted free agent with the New York Jets on 1 May 2016. He was waived on 28 July 2016 after the team re-signed quarterback Ryan Fitzpatrick.

After being waived by the Jets, Hackett began co-hosting a sports radio show on KALL in Salt Lake City.

Hackett was drafted in the first round (6th overall) in the 2022 CFL Global Draft by the Winnipeg Blue Bombers, signaling a potential return to professional play after six years. He briefly attended rookie minicamp with Winnipeg but returned to the United States amidst uncertainty regarding the player strikes prior to the 2022 CFL season.

References

External links
Utah Utes bio
New York Jets bio

1992 births
Living people
American football punters
Sportspeople from Melbourne
Australian players of American football
Utah Utes football players
All-American college football players
New York Jets players